The Azerbaijan Cup 2008–09 was the 17th season of the annual cup competition in Azerbaijan. It started on 17 September 2008 with two games of Preliminary Round and ended on 23 May 2009 with the Final held at Tofik Bakhramov Stadium in Baku. Khazar Lenkoran were the defending champions. Eighteen teams compete in this year's competition.

Preliminary round
Four lower division teams, qualified for this competition due to unknown reasons, played out two participants who would join the fourteen teams of the Azerbaijan Premier League in the next round. The games were played on September 17 (first legs) and September 24, 2008 (second legs).

|}

Round of 16
The two winners from the Preliminary Round joined fourteen Premier League teams in this round. The first legs were played on October 29 and 30, 2008. The second legs were played on November 5 and 6, 2008.

|}

Quarterfinals
The first legs were played on February 25 while the second legs were played on March 11 and 12, 2009.

|}

Semifinals
The first legs were played on April 29, 2009. The second legs were played on May 6, 2009.

|}

Final

References

External links
 Official page 

Azerbaijan Cup seasons
Azerbaijan Cup 2008-09
Azerbaijan Cup 2008-09